Lin-28 homolog A is a protein that in humans is encoded by the LIN28 gene.

LIN28 encodes an RNA-binding protein that binds to and enhances the translation of the IGF-2 (insulin-like growth factor 2) mRNA. Lin28 binds to the let-7 pre-microRNA and blocks production of the mature let-7 microRNA in mouse embryonic stem cells. In pluripotent embryonal carcinoma cells, LIN28 is localized in the ribosomes, P-bodies and stress granules.

Function

Stem cell expression 

LIN28 is thought to regulate the self-renewal of stem cells. In Caenorhabditis elegans, there is only one Lin28 gene that is expressed and in vertebrates, there are two paralogs present, Lin28a and Lin28b. In nematodes, the LIN28 homolog lin-28 is a heterochronic gene that determines the onset of early larval stages of developmental events in C. elegans, by regulating the self-renewal of nematode stem cells in the skin (called seam cells) and vulva (called VPCs) during development. In mice, LIN28 is highly expressed in mouse embryonic stem cells and during early embryogenesis.

LIN28 is highly expressed in human embryonic stem cells and can enhance the efficiency of the formation of induced pluripotent stem (iPS) cells from human fibroblasts.

Puberty 

LIN28 overexpression in mice can cause gigantism and a delay in puberty onset, consistent with human genome-wide association studies suggesting that polymorphisms in the human LIN28B gene are associated with human height and puberty timing. Mutations in LIN28B are associated with precocious puberty.

LIN28 can regulate glucose homeostasis in mammals by increasing insulin-PI3K-mTOR signaling and insulin sensitivity, thereby promoting resistance to high fat diet-induced obesity and type 2 diabetes. Aberrant expression of LIN28 has been seen to regulate aerobic glycolysis to facilitate cancer proliferation

Tissue regeneration 

Mice genetically altered to produce LIN28 during their lifespan showed improved hair growth and healthy tissue regeneration on added puncture wounds in later life stages. While the mice could regenerate limbs, they could not repair damaged heart tissue. Appropriate drugs replicated the regeneration in unaltered mice, using the same metabolic paths. The drugs increased the subjects' metabolic rates, evidently causing the body to heal at higher rates. The effects of Lin28a activation faded with age.

Structure 

Models of Lin28/let-7 complexes obtained through X-ray crystallography and NMR reveal that two folded domains of Lin28 recognize two distinct RNA regions. The domains are sufficient for inhibition of let-7 in vivo.

Applications 

LIN28 is a marker of undifferentiated human embryonic stem cells and has been used to enhance the efficiency of the formation of iPS cells from human fibroblasts.

References

Further reading

External links